The case Matías is a 1985 Argentinian film directed by Anibal Di Salvo, based on a script written in collaboration with Eduardo Mignogna according to The Argument of Miguel Ángel Materazzi. It was filmed in Eastmancolor. It premièred on 18 April 1985 and that had like main actors to Víctor Laplace, Gilds Baret, Arturo Maly and Luis Medina Castro.

Synopsis 
A Polish man finishes shut in a manicomio of Argentina subjected to the abuse of other patients and of a nurse.

References 
  (help)

External links 
 Information on  The case Matías in the place of the national cinema
 Information on  The case Matías in Internet Movie Database

1985 films
Argentine drama films
1980s Spanish-language films
1985 drama films
1985 directorial debut films
1980s Argentine films